Glyphidocera perobscura is a moth in the family Autostichidae. It was described by Walsingham in 1911. It is found in Mexico (Tabasco).

The wingspan is about 12 mm. The forewings are brownish fuscous, with a scarcely perceptible indication of three darker discal spots. The hindwings are rather paler than the forewings, brownish fuscous.

References

Moths described in 1911
Glyphidocerinae